John Wilkins (20 June 1927 at Kolar Gold Fields – 1991) was an Indian painter.

Biography
Wilkins was one of the leading painters from India which include Tyeb Mehta, S.H. Raza, M.F. Husain, Francis Newton Souza, Akbar Padamsee, Manjit Bawa and many more greats. 
His talent expressed itself in his works, in many styles, mediums and techniques – brush, sketch, commercial, fine art and portrait painting.

He has been commissioned by corporations and individuals for visual designs, paintings, portraits and illustrations. In the International art scenario his works are now in the category of the most expensive paintings in the world. He started his career by painting billboards and then went on to be Art Director with different advertising agencies and then quit his work to concentrate on his painting. His works are now one among India’s most expensive paintings.

His family life though was very turbulent. Married to his art, he hated to be disturbed at his work. While working for the Advertising Agency - Graphic Arts Industries in Bangalore he even broke the nose of an executive who disturbed his work. In the late 1970s he left home and a large family to work at his art as a recluse in Coimbatore and later in New Delhi.

Most of his paintings are held by private collectors, a few corporates and also Government Departments like the British High Commission and the Singapore High Commission. Not one to be too bothered by art accolades, he had very few exhibitions of his work, the last in New Delhi in 1982. In February 2010 an offer of $2.5 million for one of his paintings by a member of one of the Royal families from the Middle East was refused by an art collector in India.

Some of his paintings are unsigned and some not completed, lost in some random mood swing, but whatever little paint touched the canvas reveals his genius. He died in 1991 in Trichy, Tamil Nadu and was buried there at St. Christopher's Church.

See also
List of most expensive Indian artists

References

1927 births
1991 deaths
Indian male painters
Indian portrait painters
20th-century Indian painters
People from Kolar district
Painters from Karnataka
20th-century Indian male artists